Jay Lazar Garfield (born 13 November 1955) is an American professor of philosophy who specializes in Tibetan Buddhism. He also specializes on the philosophy of mind, cognitive science, epistemology, metaphysics, philosophy of language, ethics, and hermeneutics. He is currently Doris Silbert Professor in the Humanities at Smith College, professor of philosophy at the University of Melbourne, visiting professor of philosophy and Buddhist studies at Harvard Divinity School, and Adjunct Professor of Philosophy at the Central University of Tibetan Studies.

Academic career
Garfield received an A.B. from Oberlin College in 1975, and a Ph.D. from the University of Pittsburgh in 1986, where he worked with Wilfrid Sellars and Annette Baier. At the Central University of Tibetan Studies in India, he studied Nagarjuna with Geshe Yeshe Thabkhas.

He taught from 1980 to 1995 at Hampshire College, from 1996 to 1998 at the University of Tasmania, and since 1999 at Smith College.

He is editor-in-chief of the journal Sophia, and is on the editorial boards of Philosophical	Psychology, Journal	of	Indian	Philosophy	and	Religion, Australasian Philosophical	Review, Philosophy East and West, American Institute of Buddhist Studies/Columbia Center for Buddhist Studies/Tibet	House, Stanford Encyclopedia of Philosophy, and the Journal	of Buddhist Philosophy.

Garfield was the inaugural Kwan Im Thong Hood Cho Temple Professor of Humanities and 
Head of Studies, Philosophy, at Yale-NUS from 2013-2016. He said, "This Professorship has given me the opportunity of a lifetime – working with motivated, creative and talented students and colleagues and working in a community committed to building something entirely new, an Asian liberal arts college with a truly global curriculum." During his professorship at Yale-NUS, Garfield was one of six scholars who participated in a conference with the 14th Dalai Lama on "Mapping the Mind: A Dialogue between Modern Science and Buddhist Science."

Controversy over "If Philosophy Won't Diversify" 
Garfield has long been a critic of what he sees as the narrow approach of Western philosophers. He has noted that "people in our profession are still happy to treat Western philosophy as the 'core' of the discipline, and as the umarked case. So, for instance, a course that addresses only classical Greek philosophy can be comfortably titled 'Ancient Philosophy,' not 'Ancient Western Philosophy,' and a course in metaphysics can be counted on to ignore all non-Western metaphysics. A course in Indian philosophy is not another course in the history of philosophy, but is part of the non-Western curriculum." Because of his knowledge of Buddhism and commitment to encouraging the study of Asian philosophy, Garfield was invited to be the keynote speaker at a conference on non-Western philosophical traditions organized by graduate students in philosophy at the University of Pennsylvania in 2016. However, he was "outraged" that there were only "one or two" members of the regular faculty in the department who attended the event, because he felt that this showed a lack of support for their own students' interest in non-Western philosophy.

Garfield discussed this issue with another speaker at the conference, Bryan W. Van Norden, and they wrote an editorial that appeared in The Stone column of The New York Times in May of that year, entitled "If Philosophy Won't Diversify, Let's Call It What It Really Is." In this editorial, they state: "we have urged our colleagues to look beyond the European canon in their own research and teaching." However, "progress has been minimal." Consequently, so long as "the profession as a whole remains resolutely Eurocentric," Garfield and Van Norden "ask those who sincerely believe that it does make sense to organize our discipline entirely around European and American figures and texts to pursue this agenda with honesty and openness. We therefore suggest that any department that regularly offers courses only on Western philosophy should rename itself 'Department of European and American Philosophy.'"

The article received 797 comments in just 12 hours. (None of the other Stone columns that month had over 500 comments.) Garfield later explained, "I woke up to all this email in my inbox [with] people asking, 'Are you okay?' 'Do you need to talk?'" Garfield soon realized that his colleagues were expressing concern for his well-being because so many of the comments on the article expressed "vitriolic racism and xenophobia. And some of it was clearly by philosophers and students of philosophy.'" One typical comment was that Western philosophy deserves precedence because "there is a particular school of thought that caught fire, broke cultural boundaries, and laid the foundation of modern science (Does anyone want to fly in a plane built with non-western math?) and our least oppressive governmental systems." On the other hand, there were also many supportive comments: "Hear! Hear! Inclusion is the order of the day. ... More wisdom from more perspectives — what could be better? We have so much to learn from each other, if only we listen."

Garfield and Van Norden's article was almost immediately translated into Chinese, and over twenty blogs in the English-speaking world have commented or hosted discussions, including Reddit. Garfield and Van Norden's piece has continued to provoke strong reactions. Some have applauded their call for greater diversity in the US philosophical canon. In addition, their piece has been featured in several recent essays arguing for greater diversity in philosophy.

However, there has also been extensive criticism of the Garfield and Van Norden article. Articles in Aeon and Weekly Standard argued that "philosophy" is, by definition, the tradition that grows out of Plato and Aristotle, so nothing outside that tradition could count as philosophy. Professor Amy Olberding of the University of Oklahoma wrote a detailed reply to critics of Garfield and Van Norden, arguing that criticisms fall into a stereotypical pattern that betrays a fundamental misunderstanding of the issues.

Publications

Books
 Losing Ourselves: Learning to Live without a Self 	(Princeton University Press 2022)
 Buddhist Ethics: A Philosophical Exploration (Buddhist Philosophy for Philosophers) 	(Oxford	University Press 2022)
 Dignāga’s	Investigation	of	the	Percept:	A Philosophical	Legacy	in	India	and	Tibet 	(with	 Douglas	Duckworth,	David	Eckel,	John	Powers,	Yeshes	Thabkhas	and	Sonam	Thakchöe,	Oxford	University	Press 2016)
 Moonpaths:	Ethics	in	the	Context	of	Conventional	Truth	(with	the	Cowherds,	Oxford	University	Press	2015)
 Engaging	Buddhism:	Why	Does	Buddhism	Matter	to	Philosophy? (Oxford	University	Press 2015)
 Sweet	Reason:	A	Field	Guide	to	Modern	Logic,	2nd	Edition	(with	James	Henle	and	Thomas	Tymoczko.	Wiley.	(2011)
 Western	Idealism	and	its	Critics.	Central	University	of	Tibetan	Studies	Press,	Sarnath,	India,	2011,	English	only	edition,	Hobart:	Pyrrho	Press	1998.
 Moonshadows:	Conventional	Truth	in	Buddhist	Philosophy (with	the	Cowherds,	Oxford	University	Press.	(2010)
 An	Ocean	of	Reasoning:		Tsong	kha	pa’s	Great	Commentary	on	Nāgārjuna’s	Mūlamadhyamakakārika (with	Geshe	Ngawang	Samten),	Oxford	University	Press,	2006.
 Empty	Words:	Buddhist	Philosophy	and	Cross-Cultural	Interpretation.	Oxford	University	Press,	New	York,	2002.
 Translator and commentator, Fundamental	Wisdom	of	the	Middle	Way:	Nāgārjuna's	Mūlamadhyamakakārikā.	Oxford	University	Press,	New	York,	1995.
 Cognitive	Science:	An	Introduction (with	N.	Stillings,	M.	Feinstein,	E.	Rissland,	D.	Rosenbaum,	S.	Weisler,	and	L.	Baker-Ward).	Bradford	Books/MIT	Press,	1987;	2nd	edition	(with	N.	Stillings,	M.	Feinstein,	E.	Rissland,	D.	Rosenbaum,	S.	Weisler,	and	L.	Baker-Ward),	Bradford	Books/MIT	Press,	1995.
 Belief	in	Psychology:	A	Study	in	the	Ontology	of	Mind.	Bradford	Books/MIT	Press,	1988.

Edited collections
 Madhyamaka	and	Yogācāra:	Allies	or	Rivals?		(ed.,	with	J	Westerhoff),	Oxford	University	Press,	2015.
 The	Moon	Points	Back:	Buddhism,	Logic	and	Analytic	Philosophy (ed.	With	Y.	Deguchi,	G.	Priest	and	K.	Tanaka).	Oxford	University	Press,	2015
 Contrary	Thinking:	Selected	Papers	of	Daya	Krishna (with	N	Bhushan	and	D	Raveh),	Oxford	University	Press 	(2011).
 Indian	Philosophy	in	English:	Renaissance	to	Independence (with	N	Bhushan),	Oxford	University	Press	(2011).
 Oxford	Handbook	of	World	Philosophy (with	W	Edelglass),	Oxford	University	Press	(2010).
 Pointing	at	the	Moon:	Buddhism,	Logic	Analysis (with	T	Tillemans	and	M	D’Amato),	2009,	Oxford	University	Press.
 TransBuddhism:	Translation,	Transmission	and	Transformation (with	N	Bhushan	and	A	Zablocki)	2009,	the	University	of	Massachusetts	Press.	
 Buddhist	Philosophy:	Essential	Readings		(with	William	Edelglass)	2009,	Oxford	University	Press.
 Foundations	of	Cognitive	Science:	The	Essential	Readings.	Paragon	House,	New	York,	1990. 
 Meaning	and	Truth:	Essential	Readings	in	Modern	Semantics		(with	Murray	Kiteley).	Paragon	House,	New	York,	1990.
 Modularity	in	Knowledge	Representation	and	Natural	Language	Understanding.	Bradford	 Books/MIT	Press,	1987.
 Abortion:	 Moral	and	Legal	Perspectives		(with	Patricia	Hennessey).	University	of	Massachusetts	Press,	1984.

References

External links
Garfield's personal website

1955 births
American philosophy academics
Living people